PIRs, PIRS, Pirs, or pirs may mean:

 the plural of pir (disambiguation) or PIR
 Pirs (ISS module), a former module of the International Space Station
 a Russian word, Пирс, meaning "pier"
 Propulsion Information Retrieval System, part of the Chemical Propulsion Information Analysis Center
 Police Information Retrieval System, an information system used by the Royal Canadian Mounted Police
 Programme d'indicateurs du rendement scolaire du Conseil des ministres de l'Éducation, a program of the Ministry of Education, Recreation and Sports (Quebec)